The 1999–2000 season was the 37th season in the existence of Atlético de Madrid B and the club's fourth consecutive season in the second division of Spanish football. The season covered the period from 1 July 1999 to 30 June 2000.

Competitions

Overall record

Segunda División

League table

Results summary

Results by round

Matches

Source:

References

Atlético Madrid
Atlético Madrid B